Winona Ranger Station Historic District is a historic ranger station and national historic district located in Mark Twain National Forest near Winona, Shannon County, Missouri.  The district encompasses four contributing buildings, associated with a ranger station constructed by the Civilian Conservation Corps (CCC) under the supervision of a Works Progress Administration (WPA) project.  It developed between 1938 and 1938 and includes -story, Colonial Revival style ranger's dwelling, garage, warehouse, and oil house.

It was listed on the National Register of Historic Places in 2003.

References

Civilian Conservation Corps in Missouri
Works Progress Administration in Missouri
Historic districts on the National Register of Historic Places in Missouri
Colonial Revival architecture in Missouri
Buildings and structures in Shannon County, Missouri
National Register of Historic Places in Shannon County, Missouri